The LEVC TX (previously known as the TX5) is a purpose-built hackney carriage manufactured by the British commercial vehicle maker London EV Company (LEVC), a subsidiary of the Chinese auto-maker Geely. It is the latest in a succession of purpose-built hackney carriages produced by LEVC and various predecessor entities. The LEVC TX is a plug-in hybrid range-extender electric vehicle. The vehicle is designed to comply with Transport for London’s Taxi Private Hire regulations, which banned new diesel-powered taxis from January 2018, requiring zero-emissions capability.

Background
In the late 2000s, Geely was in talks over the possibility of converting London's black cabs into electric-powered vehicles. From 2014, Geely invested £480m in LEVC to develop a new taxi, with a new factory to be built in Coventry. Geely hoped to manufacture 36,000 vehicles per annum. The vehicle entered production in 2017.

Technical

The LEVC TX is built on a unique platform, underpinned by a bonded aluminium chassis built in the UK, giving the LEVC TX a 32 percent parts localisation rate by value. China and Europe each account for 32 percent of the content, while United States content is 4 percent.

The LEVC TX is powered by a full-electric hybrid drivetrain. 
It drives in full-electric mode all the time, but is recharged by an  Volvo-sourced 1.5-litre turbocharged three-cylinder petrol engine. 
The LEVC TX is fitted with a  battery pack supplied by LG Chem, and powers a  Siemens-built electric motor for traction.
When the battery pack has insufficient charge to power the vehicle, the petrol engine is claimed to achieve .

The charge connectors are mounted either side of the radiator grille, and are a CCS socket, capable of 50 kW DC and 22 kW AC, and an optional 50 kW capable CHAdeMO connector.

Service history
The TX took advantage of 2018 Transport for London rules that allowed only zero-emission capable vehicles to become additions to the city's taxi fleet. By February 2018 it was the only taxi capable of meeting these rules. 

By April 2022, over 5,000 TX vehicles has been sold in London, around a third of London's taxi fleet. In May 2022, LEVC announced that over 7,000 taxis had been sold worldwide.

See also

 LEVC VN5, a plug-in hybrid panel van based on the LEVC TX

References

External links
 LEVC TX official website

Taxis of the United Kingdom
Taxi vehicles
Cars introduced in 2017
Retro-style automobiles
Electric taxis
TX